Karat Chal (also Romanized as Karāt Chāl) is a village in Goli Jan Rural District, in the Central District of Tonekabon County, Mazandaran Province, Iran. At the 2006 census, its population was 205, in 53 families.

References 

Populated places in Tonekabon County